Helmets using ivory from boars' tusks were known in the Mycenaean world from the 17th century BC (Shaft Graves, Mycenae) to the 10th century BC (Elateia, Central Greece). The helmet was made through the use of slivers of boar tusks which were attached to a leather base, padded with felt, in rows. A description of a boar's tusk helmet appears in book ten of Homer's Iliad, as Odysseus is armed for a night raid to be conducted against the Trojans.

Fragments of ivory which might have come from helmets of this kind have been discovered on Mycenaean sites (at Dendra, for instance, fragments were found alongside the bronze panoply excavated in 1960) and an ivory plaque, also from a Mycenaean site, represents a helmet of this kind. Although they would not provide protection as good  as that of a metal helmet, they may have been worn by some leaders as a status symbol, or a means of identification.

Homer specifies that the helmet given by Meriones to Odysseus was an heirloom, passed down through the generations, a detail which perhaps suggests its value. Although the number of plates required to make an entire helmet varies – anything from 40 to 140 can be required – it has been estimated that forty to fifty boars would have to be killed to make just one helmet.

See also

 Military of Mycenaean Greece
 Germanic boar helmets

References

Iliad
Ancient Greek helmets
Mycenaean Greece
Ivory
Mycenaean art